Cheers for Miss Bishop is a 1941 American drama film based on the novel Miss Bishop by Bess Streeter Aldrich. It was directed by Tay Garnett and stars Martha Scott in the title role. The other cast members include William Gargan, Edmund Gwenn, Sterling Holloway, Dorothy Peterson, Marsha Hunt, Don Douglas, and Sidney Blackmer. This film marked the debut of Rosemary DeCamp. Cheers for Miss Bishop was produced by Richard A. Rowland and released through United Artists.

Plot
Miss Ella Bishop (Martha Scott) is a teacher at Midwestern University. The story is told in flashback and takes place over many years, from the 1880s to the 1930s, showing her from her freshman year to her retirement as an old woman. At the beginning, she lives with her mother and her vixenish cousin Amy (Mary Anderson); she remembers when her father had a farm near the town. Ella is an inhibited girl whose frustration grows as she approaches womanhood. She dreams of becoming a teacher. When she graduates from Midwestern University, she is thrilled when its president, Professor Corcoran (Edmund Gwenn), offers her a position on the faculty.

Ella becomes engaged to lawyer Delbert Thompson (Don Douglas), but Delbert is led astray by Amy and eventually has to marry her, despite loving Ella. The couple move away. After Amy becomes pregnant, Delbert abandons her. Amy dies in childbirth, leaving Ella to care for Amy's daughter Hope (Marsha Hunt). Hope grows up and marries Richard (John Archer), and they move away and have a daughter named Gretchen (Lois Ranson). Ella also has a fling with another teacher, the unhappily married John Stevens (Sidney Blackmer), but John's wife cannot give him a divorce for religious reasons, forcing Ella to break off the relationship. Later, she is distressed to learn that John has been killed.

Through all the years, Ella is supported by her friend Sam Peters (William Gargan), a local grocer who loves her. Another source of support is Professor Corcoran, who persuades her to stay when she considers leaving. His death is a blow to Ella.

As Ella reaches old age, she reflects back and realizes she allowed the years to go by without achieving what she believes to be true fulfillment. When the new president pressures her to finally retire, she agrees. However, the years have not been without glory; and her moment of triumph arrives when her numerous, now-famous students from over the years return to a testimonial dinner at the school to honor their beloved Miss Bishop.

Cast
 Martha Scott as Ella Bishop
 William Gargan as Sam Peters
 Edmund Gwenn as Professor Corcoran
 Sterling Holloway as Chris Jensen
 Dorothy Peterson as Mrs. Bishop
 Sidney Blackmer as John Stevens
 Mary Anderson as Amy Saunders
 Donald Douglas as Delbert Thompson 
 Marsha Hunt as Hope Thompson
 John Archer as Richard Clark (as Ralph Bowman)
 Lois Ranson as Gretchen Clark 
 Rosemary De Camp as Minna Fields
 Knox Manning as Anton Radcheck 
 John Arledge as 'Snapper' MacRae
 Jack Mulhall as Professor Carter
 Howard C. Hickman as Professor Lancaster (as Howard Hickman)
 Helen MacKellar as Miss Patton
 William Farnum as Judge Peters 
 Anna Mills as Mrs. Peters 
 John Hamilton as President Watts
 Pierre Watkin as President Crowder
 Charles Judels as Cecco
 Sue Moore as Stena 
 Rand Brooks as 'Buzz' Wheelwright

Technology 
Scholars such as David Bordwell have noted Cheers for Miss Bishop as one of the first films to incorporate autobiographical voiceover in its use of the flashback. The film begins with Sam and Ella in their older ages, leading Ella into flashbacks of her life, each marked with autobiographical voice-overs, from her graduation at Midwestern University in the 1880s to her retirement in the 1930s. The director uses fading transitions to symbolize the change in time. The makeup director, Don L. Cash, ably aged the actors distinctly through decades. Another technology the cinematographer used was dollies, to capture moving motion and to zoom out of scenes.

Adaptations 
Cheers for Miss Bishop was adapted as a radio play on the March 17, 1941, broadcast of Lux Radio Theater with Martha Scott and William Gargan reprising their film roles and on the November 6, 1946, broadcast of Academy Award Theater starring Olivia de Havilland. Scott also reprised the role in a radio adaptation for Hallmark Playhouse in 1949.

Awards
Cheers for Miss Bishop earned Edward Ward an Academy Award nomination for Best Scoring of a Dramatic Film. He was also nominated for scoring two other 1941 films, Tanks a Million and All-American Co-Ed. Ward earned seven Oscar nominations between 1939 and 1944, including one for the score of Phantom of the Opera (1943).

References

External links
 
 
 
 
 

1941 films
1941 romantic drama films
American black-and-white films
American romantic drama films
1940s English-language films
Films about educators
Films based on American novels
Films directed by Tay Garnett
Films set in the 1880s
Films set in the 1890s
Films set in the 1900s
Films set in the 1910s
Films set in the 1920s
Films shot in Nebraska
United Artists films
Films scored by Edward Ward (composer)
1940s American films